PMEL may refer to:

Pacific Marine Environmental Laboratory
Precision measurement equipment laboratory
 Premelanosome protein